Escuela San Felipe is a school in the San Felipe district of Alajuelita Canton, San José, Costa Rica. Founded in 1966, the school initially only had two classrooms.

See also
Education in Costa Rica

References

External links
 Aerial view
 Sistemas educativos en Costa Rica
 Ministerio de Educación -Government portal

Schools in Costa Rica